The 1939 Harvard Crimson football team was an American football team that represented Harvard University as an independent during the 1939 college football season. In its fifth season under head coach Dick Harlow, the team compiled a 4–4 record and outscored opponents by a total of 162 to 67. The team played its home games at Harvard Stadium in Boston.

Schedule

References

Harvard
Harvard Crimson football seasons
Harvard Crimson football
1930s in Boston